Cercamonius is a genus of adapiform primate that lived in Europe during the late Eocene. It was first described by Stehlin in 1912. The genus is named after the Occitan poet Cercamon, one of the earliest troubadours.

References

Bibliography

 

Prehistoric strepsirrhines
Eocene primates
Eocene mammals of Europe
Prehistoric primate genera
Fossil taxa described in 1975